Crevier is a French surname.  Notable people with the surname include:

Bruce Crevier (born 1964), American basketball performer
Daniel Crevier (born 1947), Canadian entrepreneur and artificial intelligence and image processing researcher
Jean Crevier de Saint-François (1642-1693), early French settler in New France
Jean-Baptiste Louis Crévier (1693–1765), French author
Joseph-Alexandre Crevier (1824–1889), Canadian physician and naturalist
Ron Crevier (born 1958), Canadian basketball player who played in the National Basketball Association

See also
Crevier v. Quebec, a 1981 Supreme Court of Canada case
Crevier BMW, a car dealership in Santa Ana, California
Fort Crevier, a French fort in Quebec, designated a National Historic Site of Canada
Crevier, a Canadian fuel brand - see List of automotive fuel brands

French-language surnames